is a Japanese football player. He plays for Briobecca Urayasu.

Club statistics

References

External links

1982 births
Living people
Kokushikan University alumni
Association football people from Tokyo
Japanese footballers
J2 League players
Japan Football League players
Vegalta Sendai players
Sagan Tosu players
Tokyo Verdy players
Briobecca Urayasu players
Association football midfielders